The British & Irish Lions is a rugby union team selected from players eligible for the national teams of England, Ireland, Scotland, and Wales. The Lions are a test side and most often select players who have already played for their national team, although they can pick uncapped players who are eligible for any of the four unions. The team currently tours every four years, with these rotating between Australia, New Zealand and South Africa in order. The most recent test series, the 2021 series against South Africa, was won 2–1 by South Africa.

From 1888 onwards, combined British rugby sides toured the Southern Hemisphere. The first tour was a commercial venture, undertaken without official backing. The six subsequent visits enjoyed a growing degree of support from the authorities, before the 1910 South Africa tour, which was the first tour representative of the four Home Unions. In 1949 the four Home Unions formally created a Tours Committee and for the first time, every player of the 1950 Lions squad had played internationally before the tour. The 1950s tours saw high win rates in provincial games, but the Test series were typically lost or drawn. The series wins in 1971 (New Zealand) and 1974 (South Africa) interrupted this pattern. The last tour of the amateur age took place in 1993. The Lions have also played occasional matches in the Northern Hemisphere either as one-off exhibitions or before a Southern Hemisphere tour.

Naming and symbols

Name

The Shaw and Shrewsbury team first played in 1888 and is considered the precursor of the British & Irish Lions. It was then primarily English in composition but also contained players from Scotland and Wales. Later the team used the name British Isles. On their 1950 tour of New Zealand and Australia they officially adopted the name British Lions, the nickname first used by British and South African journalists on the 1924 South African tour after the lion emblem on their ties, the emblem on their jerseys having been dropped in favour of the four-quartered badge with the symbols of the four represented unions.

When the team first emerged in the 19th century, the United Kingdom of Great Britain and Ireland was one single state. The team continued after the Irish Free State was set up in 1922, but was still known as the British Lions or British Isles. The name "British & Irish Lions" has been used since the 2001 tour of Australia. The team is often referred to simply as the Lions.

Anthem
As the Lions represent four rugby unions, which cover two sovereign states, they do not currently have a national anthem. For the 1989 tour, the British national anthem "God Save the Queen" was used. For the 2005 tour to New Zealand, the Lions management commissioned a song, "The Power of Four", although it was met with little support among Lions fans at the matches and has not been used since.

Colours and strip
For more than half a century, the Lions have worn a red jersey that sports the amalgamated crests of the four unions. Prior to 1950 the strip went through a number of significantly different formats.

Unsanctioned tours
In 1888, the promoter of the first expedition to Australia and New Zealand, Arthur Shrewsbury, demanded "something that would be good material and yet take them by storm out here". The result was a jersey in thick red, white and blue hoops, worn above white shorts and dark socks. The tours to South Africa in 1891 and 1896 retained the red, white and blue theme but this time as red and white hooped jerseys and dark blue shorts and socks. The 1899 trip to Australia saw a reversion to red, white and blue jerseys, but with the blue used in thick hoops and the red and white in thin bands. The shorts remained blue, as did the socks although a white flash was added to the latter. The one-off test in 1999 between England and Australia that was played to commemorate Australia's first test against Reverend Matthew Mullineux's British side saw England wear an updated version of this jersey. In 1903, the South Africa tour followed on from the 1896 tour, with red and white hooped jerseys. The slight differences were that the red hoops were slightly thicker than the white (the opposite was true in 1896), and the white flash on the socks introduced in 1899 was partially retained. The Australia tour of 1904 saw exactly the same kit as in 1899. In 1908, with the Scottish and Irish unions not taking part, the Anglo-Welsh side sported red jerseys with a thick white band on tour to Australia and New Zealand. Blue shorts were retained, but the socks were for the first time red, with a white flash.

Blue jerseys, the Lions named and the crest adopted

The Scots were once again involved in Tom Smyth's 1910 team to South Africa. Thus, dark blue jerseys were introduced with white shorts and the red socks of 1908. The jerseys also had a single lion-rampant crest. The 1924 tour returned to South Africa, retaining the blue jerseys but now with shorts to match. It is the 1924 tour that is credited as being the first in which the team were referred to as "the Lions", the irony being that it was on this tour that the single lion-rampant crest was replaced with the forerunner of the four-quartered badge with the symbols of the four represented unions, that is still worn today. Although the lion had been dropped from the jersey, the players had worn the lion motif on their ties as they arrived in South Africa, which led the press and public referring to them as "the Lions".

The unofficial 1927 Argentina tour used the same kit and badge, and three heraldic lions returned as the jersey badge in 1930. This was the tour to New Zealand where the tourists' now standard blue jerseys caused some controversy. The convention in rugby is for the home side to accommodate its guests when there is a clash of kit. The New Zealand side, by then already synonymous with the appellation "All Blacks", had an all black kit that clashed with the Lions' blue. After much reluctance and debate New Zealand agreed to change for the Tests and New Zealand played in all white for the first time. On the 1930 tour a delegation led by the Irish lock George Beamish expressed their displeasure at the fact that while the blue of Scotland, white of England and red of Wales were represented in the strip there was no green for Ireland. A green flash was added to the socks, which from 1938 became a green turnover (although on blue socks thus eliminating red from the kit), and that has remained a feature of the strip ever since. In 1936, the four-quartered badge returned for the tour to Argentina and has remained on the kits ever since, but other than that the strip remained the same.

Red jerseys
The adoption of the red jersey happened in the 1950 tour. A return to New Zealand was accompanied by a desire to avoid the controversy of 1930 and so red replaced blue for the jersey with the resultant kit being that which is still worn today, the combination of red jersey, white shorts and green and blue socks, representing the four unions. The only additions to the strip since 1950 began appearing in 1993, with the addition of kit suppliers logos in prominent positions. Umbro had in 1989 asked for "maximum brand exposure whenever possible" but this did not affect the kit's appearance. Since then, Nike, Adidas and Canterbury have had more overt branding on the shirts, with sponsors Scottish Provident (1997), NTL (2001), Zurich (2005), HSBC (2009 and 2013), Standard Life Investments (2017) and Vodafone (2021)

Jersey evolution

Squad

History

1888–1909

The earliest tours date back to 1888, when a 21-man squad visited Australia and New Zealand. The squad drew players from England, Scotland and Wales, though English players predominated. The 35-match tour of two host nations included no tests, but the side played provincial, city and academic sides, winning 27 matches. They played 19 games of Australian rules football, against prominent clubs in Victoria and South Australia, winning six and drawing one of these (see Australian rules football in England).

The first tour, although unsanctioned by rugby bodies, established the concept of Northern Hemisphere sporting sides touring to the Southern Hemisphere. Three years after the first tour, the Western Province union invited rugby bodies in Britain to tour South Africa. Some saw the 1891 team – the first sanctioned by the Rugby Football Union – as the England national team, though others referred to it as "the British Isles". The tourists played a total of twenty matches, three of them tests. The team also played the regional side of South Africa (South Africa did not exist as a political unit in 1891), winning all three matches. In a notable event of the tour, the touring side presented the Currie Cup to Griqualand West, the province they thought produced the best performance on the tour.

Five years later a British Isles side returned to South Africa. They played one extra match on this tour, making the total of 21 games, including four tests against South Africa, with the British Isles winning three of them. The squad had a notable Irish orientation, with the Ireland national team contributing six players to the 21-man squad.

In 1899 the British Isles touring side returned to Australia for the first time since the unofficial tour of 1888. The squad of 23 for the first time ever had players from each of the home nations. The team again participated in 21 matches, playing state teams as well as northern Queensland sides and Victorian teams. A four-test series took place against Australia, the tourists winning three out of the four. The team returned via Hawaii and Canada playing additional games en route.

Four years later, in 1903, the British Isles team returned to South Africa. The opening performance of the side proved disappointing from the tourists' point of view, with defeats in its opening three matches by Western Province sides in Cape Town. From then on the team experienced mixed results, though more wins than losses. The side lost the test series to South Africa, drawing twice, but with the South Africans winning the decider 8 to nil.

No more than twelve months passed before the British Isles team ventured to Australia and New Zealand in 1904. The tourists devastated the Australian teams, winning every single game. Australia also lost all three tests to the visitors, even getting held to a standstill in two of the three games. Though the New Zealand leg of the tour did not take long in comparison to the number of Australian games, the British Isles experienced considerable difficulty across the Tasman after whitewashing the Australians. The team managed two early wins before losing the test to New Zealand and only winning one more game as well as drawing once. Despite their difficulties in New Zealand, the tour proved a raging success on-field for the British Isles.

In 1908, another tour took place to Australia and New Zealand. In a reversal of previous practice, the planners allocated more matches in New Zealand rather than in Australia: perhaps the strength of the New Zealand teams and the heavy defeats of all Australian teams on the previous tour influenced this decision. Some commentators thought that this tour hoped to reach out to rugby communities in Australia, as rugby league (infamously) started in Australia in 1908. The Anglo-Welsh side (Irish and Scottish unions did not participate) performed well in all the non-test matches, but drew a test against New Zealand and lost the other two.

1910–1949

Visits that took place before the 1910 South Africa tour (the first selected by a committee from the four Home Unions) had enjoyed a growing degree of support from the authorities, although only one of these included representatives of all four nations. The 1910 tour to South Africa marked the official beginning of British Isles rugby tours: the inaugural tour operating under all four unions. The team performed moderately against the non-test teams, claiming victories in just over half their matches, and the test series went to South Africa, who won two of the three games. A side managed by Oxford University — supposedly the England rugby team, but actually including three Scottish players — toured Argentina at the time: the people of Argentina termed it the "Combined British".

The next British Isles team tour did not take place until 1924, again in South Africa. The team, led by Ronald Cove-Smith, struggled with injuries and lost three of the four test matches, drawing the other 3–3. In total, 21 games were played, with the touring side winning 9, drawing 3 and losing 9.

In 1927 a short, nine-game series took place in Argentina, with the British isles winning all nine encounters, and the tour was a financial success for Argentine rugby. The Lions returned to New Zealand in 1930 with some success. The Lions won all of their games that did not have test status except for the matches against Auckland, Wellington and Canterbury, but they lost three of their four test matches against New Zealand, winning the first test 6–3. The side also visited Australia, losing a test but winning five out of the six non-test games.

In 1936 the British Isles visited Argentina for the third time, winning all ten of their matches and only conceding nine points in the whole tour. Two years later in 1938 the British Isles toured in South Africa, winning more than half of their normal matches. Despite having lost the test series to South Africa by game three, they won the final test. This is when they were named THE LIONS by their then Captain Sam Walker.

1950–1969
The first post-war tour went to New Zealand and Australia in 1950. The Lions, sporting newly redesigned jerseys and displaying a fresh style of play, managed to win 22 and draw one of 29 matches over the two nations. The Lions won the opening four fixtures before losing to Otago and Southland, but succeeded in holding New Zealand to a 9–9 draw. The Lions performed well in the remaining All Black tests though they lost all three, the team did not lose another non-test in the New Zealand leg of the tour. The Lions won all their games in Australia except for their final fixture against a New South Wales XV in Newcastle. They won both tests against Australia, in Brisbane, Queensland and in Sydney.

In 1955 the Lions toured South Africa and left with another imposing record, one draw and 19 wins from the 25 fixtures. The four-test series against South Africa, a thrilling affair, ended in a drawn series.

The 1959 tour to Australia and New Zealand marked once again a very successful tour for the Lions, who only lost six of their 35 fixtures. The Lions easily won both tests against Australia and lost the first three tests against New Zealand, but did find victory (9–6) in the final test.

After the glittering decade of the 1950s, the first tour of the 1960s proved not nearly as successful as previous ones. The 1962 tour to South Africa saw the Lions still win 16 of their 25 games, but did not fare well against the Springboks, losing three of the four tests. For the 1966 tour to Australia and New Zealand John Robins became the first Lions coach, and the trip started off very well for the Lions, who stormed through Australia, winning five non-tests and drawing one, and defeating Australia in two tests. The Lions experienced mixed results during the New Zealand leg of the tour, as well as losing all of the tests against New Zealand. The Lions also played a test against Canada on their way home, winning 19 to 8 in Toronto. The 1968 tour of South Africa saw the Lions win 15 of their 16 provincial matches, but the team actually lost three tests against the Springboks and drew one.

1970–1979
The 1970s saw a renaissance for the Lions. The 1971 British Lions tour to New Zealand and Australia, centred around the skilled Welsh half-back pairing of Gareth Edwards and Barry John, secured a series win over New Zealand. The tour started with a loss to Queensland but proceeded to storm through the next provincial fixtures, winning 11 games in a row. The Lions then went on to defeat New Zealand in Dunedin. The Lions only lost one match on the rest of the tour and won the test series against New Zealand, winning and drawing the last two games, to take the series two wins to one.

The 1974 British Lions tour to South Africa was one of the best-known and most successful Lions teams. Apartheid concerns meant some players declined the tour. Nonetheless, led by the esteemed Irish forward Willie John McBride, the tour went through 22 games unbeaten and triumphed 3–0 (with one drawn) in the test series. The series featured a lot of violence. The management of the Lions concluded that the Springboks dominated their opponents with physical aggression. At that time, test match referees came from the home nation, substitutions took place only if a doctor found a player unable to continue and there were no video cameras or sideline officials to prevent violent play. The Lions decided "to get their retaliation in first" with the infamous "99 call". The Lions postulated that a South African referee would probably not send off all of the Lions if they all retaliated against "blatant thuggery". Famous video footage of the 'battle of Boet Erasmus Stadium' shows JPR Williams running over half of the pitch and launching himself at Van Heerden after such a call.

The 1977 British Lions tour to New Zealand saw the Lions drop only one non-test out of 21 games, a loss to a Universities side. The team did not win the test series though, winning one game but losing the other three.

In August 1977 the British Lions made a stopover in Fiji on the way home from their tour of New Zealand. Fiji beat them 25–21 at Buckhurst Park, Suva.

1980–1989
The Lions toured South Africa in 1980, and completed a flawless non-test record, winning 14 out of 14 matches. The Lions lost the first three tests to South Africa, only winning the last one once the Springboks were guaranteed to win the series.

The 1983 tour to New Zealand saw the team successful in the non-test games, winning all but two games, but being whitewashed in the test series against New Zealand.

A tour to South Africa by the Lions was anticipated in 1986, but the invitation for the Lions to tour was never accepted because of controversy surrounding Apartheid and the tour did not go ahead. The Lions did not return to South Africa until 1997, after the Apartheid era. A Lions team was selected in April 1986 for the International Rugby Board centenary match against 'The Rest'. The team was organised by the Four Home Unions Committee and the players were given the status of official British Lions.

The Lions tour to Australia in 1989 was a shorter affair, being only 12 matches in total. The tour was very successful for the Lions, who won all eight non-test matches and won the test series against Australia, two to one.

1990–1999
The tour to New Zealand in 1993 was the last of the amateur era. The Lions won six and lost four non-test matches, and lost the test series 2–1. The tour to South Africa in 1997 was a success for the Lions, who completed the tour with only two losses, and won the test series 2–1.

2000–2009

In 2001, the ten-game tour to Australia saw the Wallabies win the test series 2–1. This series saw the first award of the Tom Richards Trophy. In the Lions' 2005 tour to New Zealand, coached by Clive Woodward, the Lions won seven games against provincial teams, were defeated by the New Zealand Maori team, and suffered heavy defeats in all three tests.

In 2009, the Lions toured South Africa. There they faced the World Cup winners South Africa, with Ian McGeechan leading a coaching team including Warren Gatland, Shaun Edwards and Rob Howley. The Lions were captained by Irish lock Paul O'Connell. The initial Lions selection consisted of fourteen Irish players, thirteen Welsh, eight English and two Scots in the 37-man squad. In the first Test on 20 June, they lost 26–21, and lost the series in the second 28–25 in a tightly fought game at Loftus Versfeld on 27 June. The Lions won the third Test 28–9 at Ellis Park, and the series finished 2–1 to South Africa.

2010–2019
During June 2013 the British & Irish Lions toured Australia. Former Scotland and Lions full-back Andy Irvine was appointed as tour manager in 2010. Wales head coach Warren Gatland was the Lions' head coach, and their tour captain was Sam Warburton. The tour started in Hong Kong with a match against the Barbarians before moving on to Australia for the main tour featuring six provincial matches and three tests. The Lions won all but one non-test matches, losing to the Brumbies 14–12 on 18 June. The first test was followed shortly after this, which saw the Lions go 1-up over Australia winning 23–21. Australia did have a chance to take the win in the final moments of the game, but a missed penalty by Kurtley Beale saw the Lions take the win. The Wallabies drew the series in the second test winning 16–15, though the Lions had a chance to steal the win had it not been because of a missed penalty by Leigh Halfpenny. With tour captain Warburton out of the final test due to injury, Alun Wyn Jones took over the captaincy in the final test in Sydney. The final test was won by the Lions in what was a record win, winning 41–16 to earn their first series win since 1997 and their first over Australia since 1989.

Following his winning tour of Australia in 2013, Warren Gatland was reappointed as Lions Head Coach for the tour to New Zealand in June and July 2017. In April 2016, it was announced that the side would again be captained again by Sam Warburton. The touring schedule included 10 games: an opening game against the Provincial Barbarians, challenge matches against all five of New Zealand's Super Rugby sides, a match against the Māori All Blacks and three tests against . The Lions defeated the Provincial Barbarians in the first game of the tour, before being beaten by the Blues three days later. The team recovered to beat the Crusaders but this was followed up with another midweek loss, this time against the Highlanders. The Lions then faced the Māori All Blacks, winning comfortably to restore optimism and followed up with their first midweek victory of the tour against the Chiefs. On 24 June, the Lions, captained by Peter O'Mahony, faced New Zealand in Eden Park in the first Test and were beaten 30–15. This was followed by the final midweek game of the tour, a draw against the Hurricanes. For the second Test, Gatland recalled Warburton to the starting team as captain. In Wellington Regional Stadium, the Lions beat a 14-man New Zealand side 24–21 after Sonny Bill Williams was red-carded at the 24-minute mark after a shoulder charge on Anthony Watson. This tied the series going into the final game, ending the side's 47-game winning run at home. In the final test at Eden Park the following week, the teams were tied at 15 points apiece with 78 minutes gone. Romain Poite signaled a penalty to New Zealand for an offside infringement after Ken Owens received the ball in front of his teammate Liam Williams, giving New Zealand the opportunity to kick for goal and potentially win the series. Poite, however, decided to downgrade the penalty to a free-kick after discussing with assistant referee Jérôme Garcès and Lions captain Sam Warburton. The match finished as a draw and the series was tied.

2020–present
Warren Gatland was Lions head coach again for the tour to South Africa in 2021. In December 2019, the Lions' Test venues were announced, but the tour was significantly disrupted by the COVID-19 pandemic, and all the games were played behind closed doors. South Africa won the test series by two games to one. In the deciding third test, Morne Steyn again kicked a late penalty to win the series.

Overall test match record

Updated 31 July 2021

Overall test series results

Tours

Format
The Lions now regularly tour three Southern Hemisphere countries; Australia, South Africa and New Zealand. They also toured Argentina three times before the Second World War. Since 1989 tours have been held every four years. The most recent tour was to South Africa in 2021.

In a break with tradition, the 2005 tour of New Zealand was preceded by a "home" fixture against Argentina at the Millennium Stadium in Cardiff on 23 May 2005. It finished in a 25–25 draw. A similar fixture was held against Japan before the 2021 tour of South Africa at Murrayfield, with the Lions winning 28-10.

On tour, games take place against local provinces, clubs or representative sides as well as test matches against the host's national team.

The Lions and their predecessor teams have also played games against other nearby countries on tour. For example, they played Rhodesia in 1910, 1924, 1938, 1955, 1962, 1968 and 1974 during their tours to South Africa. They were also beaten by Fiji on their 1977 tour to New Zealand. In addition, they visited pre-independence Namibia (then South West Africa), in 1955, 1962, 1968 and 1974.

There have also been games in other countries on the way home.

Other matches

Lions non-tour and home matches

The Lions have played a number of other matches against international opposition. With the exception of the matches against Argentina in 2005 and Japan in 2021, which were preparation matches for Lions tours, these matches have been one-offs to mark special occasions.

The Lions played an unofficial international match in 1955 at Cardiff Arms Park against a Welsh XV to mark the 75th anniversary of the Welsh Rugby Union. The Lions won 20–17 but did not include all the big names of the 1955 tour, such as Tony O'Reilly, Jeff Butterfield, Phil Davies, Dickie Jeeps, Bryn Meredith and Jim Greenwood.

In 1977, the Lions played their first official home game, against the Barbarians as a charity fund-raiser held as part of the Queen's silver jubilee celebrations. The Baa-Baas line-up featured JPR Williams, Gerald Davies, Gareth Edwards, Jean-Pierre Rives and Jean-Claude Skrela. The Lions included 13 of the team who played in the fourth test against New Zealand three weeks before and won 23–14.

In 1986, a match was organised against The Rest as a warm-up to the 1986 South Africa tour, and as a celebration to mark the International Rugby Board's centenary. The Lions lost 15–7 and the planned tour was subsequently cancelled.

In 1989, the Lions played against France in Paris. The game formed part of the celebrations of the bi-centennial of the French Revolution. The Lions, captained by Rob Andrew, won 29–27.

In 1990, a Four Home Unions team played against the Rest of Europe in a match to raise money for the rebuilding of Romania following the overthrow of Nicolae Ceaușescu in December 1989. The team used the Lions' logo, while the Rest of Europe played under the symbol of the Romanian Rugby Federation.

Player records
Players in bold are still active at international level.
Only matches against full international sides are listed.

Most caps

Updated 7 August 2021

Most points

Updated 31 July 2021

Most tries

Updated 31 July 2021

See also

List of British & Irish Lions test matches
Rugby union and apartheid
Rugby union in the British Isles

Notes

a.  Names of the Lions in the languages of Britain and Ireland:
 English: British & Irish Lions

References

Bibliography

External links

 

 
International rugby union teams
Multinational rugby union teams
1888 establishments in the United Kingdom